11 A.M. (lit. "AM 11:00") is a 2013 South Korean sci-fi thriller film directed by Kim Hyun-seok, and starring Jung Jae-young, Kim Ok-bin and Choi Daniel. It was released in theaters on November 28, 2013.

Plot
In the not-so distant future, researchers at a deep-sea laboratory have finally invented a time machine. The device can move objects ahead 24 hours, but the scientists have never tried it on people before. Head researcher Woo-seok is promised major funding from a mega-corporation if he completes a test run. Along with his assistant Young-eun, he schedules a jump to 11 a.m. the next day. Upon their successful arrival, they find the base in pandemonium, while the other researchers have disappeared. What's more, someone is out to get them. With the surveillance camera recordings as the sole clue, they must investigate for the next 24 hours the mysterious happenings that occurred at the lab, figure out what happened over the past day and go back in time in order to prevent it.

Cast
Jung Jae-young as Woo-seok, the brilliant physicist leading the time travel project
Kim Ok-bin as Young-eun, a cool-headed researcher
Kim Sung-kyung  as young Young-eun
Choi Daniel as Ji-wan, a rational physicist who puts more trust into people than technology 
Lee Dae-yeon as Chief Jo
Park Chul-min as Park Young-shik
Lee Geon-joo as Kim Moon-soon
Shin Da-eun as Namgoong Sook
Oh Kwang-rok as Doctor Seo

References

External links
  
 
 
 

2013 films
South Korean science fiction thriller films
2010s science fiction thriller films
Films about time travel
CJ Entertainment films
2010s Korean-language films
2010s South Korean films